State Route 150 (SR 150) is an east–west state highway in the eastern portion of Ohio, a U.S. state. Its eastern terminus is in the village of Rayland at a parclo AB-2 interchange with State Route 7, with all of the ramps on the northeastern side of the interchange.

Route description
State Route 150 runs entirely within the southern part of Jefferson County.  No section of this highway is included as a part of the National Highway System, a network of highways deemed most important for the nation's economy, mobility and defense.

History
When established in 1924, State Route 150 was routed along the southern Jefferson County alignment that it maintains to this day.  There have been no changes of major significance to State Route 150 since its inception.

Major intersections

State Route 150A
State Route 150A (SR 150A, OH 150A) is a short alternate route of State Route 150.  Running just 0.43 miles in length, State Route 150A begins at State Route 150 when it travels under the State Route 7 bridge in Rayland.  State Route 150A travels north until it intersects and becomes the on-ramp for State Route 7 northbound.

References

External links

 State Route 150 Endpoint Photos

150
Transportation in Jefferson County, Ohio